Eirik Brandsdal (born November 11, 1986) is a Norwegian former cross-country skier who began competing in 2005. His five World Cup victories came in sprint events in Otepää on 23 January 2011, in Milan on 14 January 2012, in Drammen on 7 March 2012, in Kuusamo on 29 November 2014 and in Drammen on 8 March 2017. He retired after the 2019–20 season, which he announced on 24 March 2020.

Cross-country skiing results
All results are sourced from the International Ski Federation (FIS).

Olympic Games

World Championships

World Cup

Season standings

Individual podiums
 9 victories – (7 , 2 )
 24 podiums – (19 , 5 )

Team podiums
 8 podiums – (8 )

References

External links

 
 
 

1986 births
Living people
Norwegian male cross-country skiers
Cross-country skiers at the 2014 Winter Olympics
Cross-country skiers at the 2018 Winter Olympics
Olympic cross-country skiers of Norway
Skiers from Oslo